Jean Harbor (born 19 September 1965 in Lagos, Nigeria) is a former Nigerian American soccer forward who played for numerous teams in Nigeria and the US He earned fifteen caps with the US national team after becoming a US citizen in 1992.

Youth
While born and raised in Nigeria, Harbor attended college at Alabama A&M University in Normal, Alabama the United States.  He majored in chemistry and was a forward on the men's soccer team from 1983 to 1986.  He was a three time second and third team All-American and held the school's career scoring record when he graduated.

Early career
Before coming to the US, Harbor had spent time with two Nigerian teams, Nepa F.C. and Enugu Rangers.  However, he does not appear to have played professionally for two years after graduating from Alabama A&M.  One article mentions that he worked in a Maryland laboratory for several years after leaving Alabama.  He apparently even continued to work at the facility after he began his professional playing career.

Professional
In June 1988, the Washington Diplomats of the new American Soccer League (ASL) signed Harbor.  Diplomats coach, Julio Pinon, spotted Harbor when Harbor was playing in the Embassy Cup Tournament in Washington, D.C. The Diplomats had been having difficulty scoring up to that point in the season, but Harbor made an immediate positive impact. The team went on to win the ASL championship.

Harbor continued his high scoring ways in the 1989 season, but was suspended by the league after striking Pedro Magallanes in the face during a game with the Fort Lauderdale Strikers. The suspension ran for a month and helped limit Harbor to seven goals that season. In 1990, Harbor moved to the Maryland Bays.  By this time the ASL had merged with the Western Soccer League to form the American Professional Soccer League (APSL).  Harbor would spend two seasons with the Bays.  In 1990, he scored eight goals as the Bays took the league championship in a 2–1 victory over the San Francisco Bay Blackhawks.   In 1991, he led the league in scoring with seventeen goals and eleven assists in twenty games as the Bays fell to the Albany Capitals in the semi-finals.  Harbor took first team All APSL and league MVP honors.  The team folded at the end of the season.

With the collapse of the Bays, Harbor moved indoors in the fall of 1991 with the Baltimore Blast of Major Indoor Soccer League (MISL).  However, Harbor once again saw his team fold, this time along with the entire league, at the end of the season.  In 1992, Harbor returned to the APSL, this time with the Tampa Bay Rowdies.  By this time, the league was struggling and had only five teams remaining.  However, Harbor continued his high scoring ways and took the scoring title with thirteen goals and four assists in fifteen games, earning first team All Star honors. The Rowdies reached the championship game, only to fall to the Colorado Foxes.  His five goals in four matches led all scorers in the 1992 Professional Cup, which involved eight clubs from three different leagues; the APSL, the CSL, and the NPSL. Just as in the APSL regular season and APSL championship game, the Rowdies were again bested by Colorado in the Cup final. Harbor saw a significant drop in his point production in 1993 as he scored only five goals, adding seven assists, in fourteen games. The Rowdies saw more playoff disappointment as they fell to the Foxes again, this time in the semi-finals.  At the end of the season, Harbor again saw his team fold.

In 1994, Harbor moved to the Montreal Impact.  He gained a measure of revenge on the Colorado Foxes this season as the Impact defeated them in the title game; Harbor scored the lone goal in the Impact's 1–0 victory. In March 1995, Harbor signed with the indoor Buffalo Blizzard of the NPSL.  The Blizzard were making a final push for the playoffs.  While the Blizzard made the playoffs, they fell to the Cleveland Crunch in the first round.  Harbor played seven regular season games, scoring two goals, then another three games in the playoffs for the Blizzard. In April 1995, Major League Soccer (MLS) signed Harbor.  However, when the league delayed its first season by a year, the league loaned him to the Seattle SeaDogs of the Continental Indoor Soccer League (CISL).  In twenty-six games, he scored forty goals.

In February 1996, MLS held its first draft.  The Colorado Rapids selected Harbor with the second pick of the draft.  In that first season, Harbor led the team in scoring with eleven goals in twenty-nine games, but the Rapids finished at the bottom of the table and failed to make the playoffs.  Harbor then injured his knee in the 1997 pre-season, requiring surgery.  The Rapids released Harbor in June 1997.  After being released by the Rapids, Harbor returned to the Seattle SeaDogs where he was MVP of the All Star game. That season Harbor also helped lead Seattle to the final CISL Championship defeating the Houston Hotshots 2 games to 0. Once again, Harbor saw a team and a league fold at the end of the season.  In October 1997, Harbor moved to the Florida ThunderCats of the NPSL as the team began preparations for its first, and ultimately, its only season.  The ThunderCats had significant financial problems during the 1998–1999 season and sold Harbor's contract to the Philadelphia KiXX just prior to the 1999 playoffs.  Harbor's time in Philadelphia included only the end of the 1998–1999 season and the playoffs.

National team
In 1992, Harbor became an American citizen.  US coach Bora Milutinović quickly called him up for a 9 October match with Canada.  Harbor went on to earn fourteen caps while Milutinovic was coach, but he was unable to score.  Milutinovic dropped him from the national team after the 1993 Copa America, but he earned one more cap under Steve Sampson on 16 October 1996.  The regular national team players had gone on strike and USSF was forced to field an ad hoc player line up for a game against Peru.

Post playing career
In 2004, Harbor worked for NASA.

In Spring of 2004, Harbor will be holding Soccer Clinics for Global Perspective Youth Sports of Buckeye, AZ

References

External links
 Rapids announcing signing of Harbor

1965 births
Living people
Sportspeople from Lagos
1992 King Fahd Cup players
1993 Copa América players
Alabama A&M Bulldogs men's soccer players
American soccer players
American expatriate sportspeople in Canada
American expatriate soccer players
American Professional Soccer League players
American Soccer League (1988–89) players
Baltimore Blast (1980–1992) players
Buffalo Blizzard players
Colorado Rapids players
Continental Indoor Soccer League players
Expatriate soccer players in Canada
Expatriate soccer players in the United States
Florida ThunderCats players
Association football forwards
Major Indoor Soccer League (1978–1992) players
Major League Soccer players
Maryland Bays players
Montreal Impact (1992–2011) players
Rangers International F.C. players
National Professional Soccer League (1984–2001) players
Nigerian expatriate footballers
Nigerian expatriate sportspeople in Canada
Nigerian footballers
Nigerian emigrants to the United States
Philadelphia KiXX (NPSL) players
Seattle SeaDogs players
Tampa Bay Rowdies (1975–1993) players
United States men's international soccer players
Washington Diplomats (1988–1990) players